The Woodcock–Johnson Tests of Cognitive Abilities is a set of intelligence tests first developed in 1977 by Richard Woodcock and Mary E. Bonner Johnson (although Johnson's contribution is disputed). It was revised in 1989, again in 2001, and most recently in 2014; this last version is commonly referred to as the WJ IV. They may be administered to children from age two right up to the oldest adults (with norms utilizing individuals in their 90s). The previous edition WJ III was praised for covering "a wide variety of cognitive skills".

Content of the tests
The Woodcock-Johnson III Tests of Cognitive Abilities include both the Standard Battery and the Extended Battery. The Standard Battery consists of tests 1 through 10 while the Extended Battery includes tests 11 through 20. There is also a Woodcock-Johnson III Diagnostic Supplement to the Tests of Cognitive Abilities with an additional 11 cognitive tests. All of which combined allows for a considerably detailed analysis of cognitive abilities. The Cattell–Horn–Carroll theory factors that this test examines are based on 9 broad stratum abilities which are: Comprehension-Knowledge, Long-Term Memory, Visual-Spatial Thinking, Auditory Processing, Fluid Reasoning, Processing Speed, Short-Term Memory, Quantitative Knowledge and Reading-Writing. A General Intellectual Ability (GIA) or Brief Intellectual Ability (BIA) may be obtained. The BIA score is derived from three cognitive tests which include Verbal Comprehension, Concept Formation, and Visual Matching. These three cognitive tests measure three abilities; Comprehension-Knowledge (Gc), Fluid Reasoning (Gf), and Processing Speed (Gs), which best represents an individual's verbal ability, thinking ability, and efficiency in performing cognitive tasks. The BIA takes about 10 to 15 minutes to administer and is especially useful for screenings, re-evaluations that don't require a comprehensive intellectual assessment, or research that needs a short but reliable measure of intelligence. On the other hand, the GIA obtained from the WJ III Tests of Cognitive Abilities provide a more comprehensive assessment of general ability (g) and the score is based on a weighted combination of tests that best represents a common ability underlying all intellectual performance.

List of tests 

Citation:

Citation:

Published versions
The test is currently in its fourth edition, published by Riverside Insights. The Woodcock-Johnson III and IV are suitable for assessment of giftedness, and are accepted as qualifying evidence by high-IQ societies such as Intertel and Mensa.

References

Further reading

Intelligence tests
Works about children
Medical assessment and evaluation instruments